City of Caterpillar is an American post-hardcore band from Richmond, Virginia, formed in 2000. They have released a split with Pg. 99, two studio albums, and a full-length compilation of demos and live tracks. Their songs, some of which are over 10 minutes long, are often characterized by melodic post-rock passages building up into chaotic outbursts.

City of Caterpillar shared band members with Pg. 99, Darkest Hour, Stop It!!, Enemy Soil, Kilara, Monotonashhfuck, and later Majority Rule. They broke up in December 2003, with Jeff and Kevin going on to join Haram as well as forming the bands Malady and Verse En Coma (the latter also featuring Ryan Parrish), and Brandon and Pat forming Ghastly City Sleep.

The band broke up in late 2003, but announced a string of reunion shows across the east coast of the United States in 2016. News of the bands reunion came after Repeater Records reissued their self-titled album. The band also announced a European tour for the summer of 2017 and a Japanese tour in the summer of 2018. City Of Caterpillar announced a new album in August 2022 titled "Mystic Sisters" set to be released on Relapse Records as well as dates for an upcoming tour. Following the announcement Mystic Sisters was released on  September 30, 2022.

Members

Current members 
 Brandon Evans - vocals, guitar (2000-2003, 2016–present)
 Jeff Kane - guitar (2000-2003, 2016–present)
 Kevin Longendyke - vocals, bass (2000-2003, 2016–present)
 Ryan Parrish - drums (2000-2002, 2016–present)

Past members 
 Adam Juresko - bass (2000)

Touring Members 

 Pat Broderick - drums (2001-2003)

Discography 
Studio albums
City of Caterpillar (2002, Level Plane)
Mystic Sisters (2022, Relapse Records)

Singles and EPs
Split 7-inch with System 2600 (2000, Sea of Dead Pirates)
Document #9: A Split Personality split 7-inch with Pg. 99 (2001, Level Plane)
Live In New York City (2001, Level Plane)
Unreleased Demos (2013, Robotic Empire)  (released on the Robotic Empire SoundCloud page)
As the Curtains Dim; (Little White Lie) (2016, Robotic Empire)
Driving Spain Up a Wall (2017, Repeater Records)

Compilation albums
Demo and Live Recording (2002, Level Plane)
Complete Discography (2018, Long Legs Long Arms)

References

External links
 City of Caterpillar page at Level Plane Records 
 City of Caterpillar Final Demos

American post-hardcore musical groups
American screamo musical groups
American emo musical groups
American post-rock groups
Punk rock groups from Virginia
Hardcore punk groups from Virginia
Alternative rock groups from Virginia
Indie rock musical groups from Virginia
2000 establishments in Virginia
2006 disestablishments in Virginia
Musical groups established in 2000
Musical groups disestablished in 2003
Musical groups reestablished in 2006
Level Plane Records artists